Hugo Vonlanthen (12 June 1930 – 28 April 2009) was a Swiss field hockey player. He competed in the men's tournament at the 1952 Summer Olympics.

References

External links
 

1930 births
2009 deaths
Swiss male field hockey players
Olympic field hockey players of Switzerland
Field hockey players at the 1952 Summer Olympics